Cashan, Kashan (possibly from Quechua kasha thorn or spine -n a suffix) or Tijeraspunta is a mountain in the Cordillera Blanca in the Andes of Peru, about  high. It is located in the Ancash Region, Huaraz Province, in the districts of Huaraz and Olleros. Cashan lies southeast of the town of Huaraz, southwest of Huantsán, west of Uruashraju and northeast of Shacsha.

References

Mountains of Peru
Mountains of Ancash Region